Alexandre Paes Lopes (born 29 October 1974) is a Brazilian former footballer who played as a defender. He played for the Brazil national team at 1996 CONCACAF Gold Cup.

Career statistics

Club

International

References

External links

1974 births
Living people
Brazilian footballers
Brazilian expatriate footballers
Criciúma Esporte Clube players
Sport Club Corinthians Paulista players
Sport Club do Recife players
Fluminense FC players
FC Spartak Moscow players
Expatriate footballers in Russia
Goiás Esporte Clube players
Tokyo Verdy players
Expatriate footballers in Japan
J1 League players
Sport Club Internacional players
Associação Portuguesa de Desportos players
Esporte Clube Vitória players
Mirassol Futebol Clube players
Brazil international footballers
Campeonato Brasileiro Série A players
Russian Premier League players
Association football defenders
1996 CONCACAF Gold Cup players
Footballers from Rio de Janeiro (city)